Lovie Olivia is an American multidisciplinary visual artist. She uses the media of printmaking, painting, and installations to explore themes of gender, sexuality, race, class and power.

Early life and education
Olivia is a native of Houston, Texas and attended Kinder High School for the Performing and Visual Arts (HSPVA). She frequently works on large wood panels covered in multiple layers of plaster which are manipulated and completed with fresco paintings.

Work 
As a multidisciplinary artist, Olivia works across various media including printmaking, painting, fresco, digital and graphic design, and audiovisual and sculptural installation. Olivia's work revolves around a number of interrelated issues important for a number underrepresented communities that all connect back to her own identity and life experience under the labeled categories of: "Female, Black, Gay, etc." The press release for Olivia's 2010 solo exhibition Thrice Removed at Spacetaker ARC Gallery in Houston, Texas, characterizes the show as:A play on the phrase “twice removed” denoting familial relations through a system of “removals,” Olivia re-contextualizes this terminology to imply separation from African traditions and customs, male authority, and heterosexual privilege in this new solo show. Her work explores the multi-dimensionality of women of African Diaspora in light of the challenges and joy associated with a hybridized presence. Part autobiographical-part objective, Olivia zeroes in on the complex histories of racism, sexism, and classism in America, which intersect for ‘thrice’ the barrier to equal opportunity. Her exhibition, influenced by recorded conversations, video footage, folklore, and ancestral documents, redefines these selves outside conventional depictions in a celebration of identity.In these four sentences alone, readers are made away of a number of hinge-points for Olivia's work: the ways in which privilege, power, and tradition are shaped and overwritten by monolithic discourses of race, sex, and class. In Thrice Removed, working against the potential to flatten or reduce underrepresented identities, Olivia complicates and expands identity through numerous media and "documents" that emphasize the "truth" of such identity, and yet she also allows space for the discomfort, tensions, and contradictions inherent to such a kind of "hybridized presence." Painting and carving into plaster and pigment, Olivia's "contemporary frescoes" for this exhibition marked a departure in her work to that point.

Career 
Olivia is the recipient of the Individual Artist Grant Award 2009 and 2014 offered by Houston Arts Alliance and funded by the City of Houston. In 2018 she was on a panel assembled by the City of Houston to select artists to create 40 new mini-murals for the city. She is a member of the ROUX artist collective alongside Ann Johnson, Rabéa Ballin, and Delita Martin. She has participated in exhibitions, including:

 2020 - 9, Civic TV, Houston
2019 - The Wright Gallery in the College of Architecture at Texas A&M University, College Station
2019 - ACRE Projects, Chicago, Illinois
2019 - Presa House Gallery, San Antonio
2018 - Lawndale Art Center, Houston
2017 - Woman Made Gallery, Chicago, Illinois
2017 - Corridor Gallery, Brooklyn, New York
2017 - Galveston Arts Center(as ROUX), Galveston
2017 - Art League Houston (as ROUX), Houston
2016 - Vanderbilt University, Nashville, Tennessee
 2016 - Station Museum of Contemporary Art, Houston
 2015 - Art League Houston
 2015 - University Museum at Texas Southern University (as ROUX), Houston
 2014 - Project Row Houses, Houston
 2013 - Art League Houston
 2013 - University Museum at Texas Southern University
 2012 - Gallery M Squared, Houston 
 2011 - Houston Museum of African American Culture
 2010 - Spacetaker Artist Resource Center, Houston

References

External links 
 

Living people
American women printmakers
American women painters
American women installation artists
American installation artists
People from Houston
Year of birth missing (living people)
21st-century American women artists
African-American women artists
African-American painters
People from Harris County, Texas
Artists from Houston
American contemporary painters
African-American printmakers
21st-century African-American women
21st-century African-American artists